The 26th IBU Open European Championships were held in Raubichi, Belarus from 20 to 24 February 2019. It was also a stage of the 2018–19 Biathlon IBU Cup.

There were a total of eight competitions held: Single Mixed Relay, Relay Mixed, Sprint Women, Sprint Men, Pursuit Women, Pursuit Men, Individual Women and Individual Men.

Schedule
All times are local (UTC+3).

Results

Men's

Women's

Mixed

Medal table

References

2019
2019 in biathlon
2019 in Belarusian sport
International sports competitions hosted by Belarus
Sports competitions in Minsk
2010s in Minsk
February 2019 sports events in Europe